Larryleachia marlothii is a summer-flowering succulent plant native to Namibia and southern Angola.

Description
Grey-green and sometimes brown, Larryleachia marlothii grows as a separate, cylindrical stem of up to 6 inches tall spiralled with 12–19 ribs of blunt mammillae. Flowers appear in the summer and feature a dark, spotted, 5-pointed corolla and a distinct cross shape in the centre.

Cultivation
Larryleachia marlothii can be grown as a graft on Ceropegia tubers. It must be kept in a brightly lit location throughout the winter.

References
The Complete Encyclopedia of Succulents by Zdenek Jezek and Libor Kunte

marlothii
Flora of Southern Africa
Plants described in 1909
Taxa named by N. E. Brown